Edward, Ted, Teddy, Ed, Eddy or Eddie Morgan may refer to:

Sports
 Teddy Morgan (1880–1949), Welsh international rugby union player
 Ted Morgan (boxer) (1906–1952), Olympic boxer from New Zealand
 Eddie Morgan (rugby union) (1913–1978), Wales international rugby player
 Ed Morgan (baseball) (1904–1980), American baseball player for the Cleveland Indians and Boston Red Sox
 Eddie Morgan (baseball) (1914–1982), American baseball player for the St. Louis Cardinals and Brooklyn Dodgers

Politics and law
 Edward Morgan (governor) (died 1665), Welsh politician, Governor of Jamaica
 J. Ed Morgan (born 1947), American politician, Mississippi state senator
 Ed Morgan (professor) (born 1955), Canadian professor of international law

Others
 Edward Morgan (priest) (died 1642), Welsh Catholic priest
 Sir Edward Morgan, 1st Baronet (died 1653), Welsh noble, Catholic supporter of King Charles I during the English Civil War
 Edward Morgan (Archdeacon of Ardfert) (fl. 1660s–1670s), Irish Anglican priest
 Edward Delmar Morgan (1840–1909), English explorer and linguist
 Edward M. Morgan (1855–1925), American postmaster of New York
 Edward P. Morgan (1910–1993), American newspaper, radio and television journalist
 Ted Morgan (writer) (born 1932), French-American biographer, journalist, and historian
 Edward Morgan (choreographer) (fl. 1990s), American dancer and choreographer

See also
 Edwin Morgan (disambiguation)